Speed limits in India vary by state and vehicle type. In April 2018, the Union Ministry of Road Transport and Highways fixed the maximum speed limit on expressways at 120 km/h, for national highways at 100 km/h, and for urban roads at 70 km/h for M1 category of vehicles. The M1 category includes most passenger vehicles which have fewer than 8 seats. State and local governments in India may fix lower speed limits than those prescribed by the Union Ministry.

References

India
Road transport in India
Law of India
Traffic law